English Local Government is a series of nine books written by Sidney Webb and Beatrice Webb between 1906 and 1929 concerning UK constitutional and UK administrative law, relating to public services and local councils.

Volumes
 
 
 
 
 
  With preface by George Bernard Shaw.

See also
UK labour law

External links
 

United Kingdom administrative law